The British Academy of Film and Television Arts (BAFTA) EE Game of the Year, formerly EE Mobile Game of the Year is an award presented annually at the British Academy Games Awards honouring "the best game of the year, as voted for by the public". The award is sponsored by the telecommunications company EE Limited and winners receive a special solid yellow BAFTA statuette as opposed to the standard golden statuettes given to the recipients of other categories. 

It was first presented to Old School RuneScape at the 15th British Academy Games Awards in 2018 as a fan-voted companion to the British Academy Games Award for Mobile Game, but was expanded in 2021 to include games on any platform. Nintendo are the most nominated developer, with three, and are also have the most nominations without a win. Among publishers, Sony Interactive Entertainment lead with four nominations, including one win. 

The current holder of the award is Unpacking by Goodbye World and Skybound Games, which won at the 18th British Academy Games Awards in 2022.

Winners and nominees
In the following table, the years are listed as per BAFTA convention, and generally correspond to the year of game release in the United Kingdom, with the ceremony generally being held the year after.

EE Mobile Game of the Year

EE Game of the Year

Multiple nominations and wins

Developers

Publishers

References

External links
Official website

EE Game of the Year
Awards for best video game